"Disarm" is a song by American alternative rock band the Smashing Pumpkins. It was the third single from their second album, Siamese Dream (1993), and became a top-20 hit in Australia, Canada, and the United Kingdom despite being banned in the latter country due to the song's lyrical content.

Lyrics
The BBC banned "Disarm" from Top of the Pops because of the lyric "cut that little child", and it received little radio airplay in the United Kingdom. That lyric along with lyrics like "what I choose is my choice" and "the killer in me is the killer in you" has also led to some controversy, as some read it as a reference to abortion. The band's frontman Billy Corgan has stated that the song reflects the shaky relationship he had with his parents while growing up. Corgan revealed at a performance in 2019 that the song was written on the same day as "Today", which he called his "Suicidal Anthem".

Release
The song peaked at number eleven on the UK Singles Chart. In the U.S., the song failed to reach the Billboard Hot 100 but it peaked number forty-eight on the Hot 100 Airplay chart, it also peaked at number five on the Mainstream Rock Tracks chart and number eight on the Modern Rock Tracks chart.

Two versions of the single were produced. Each version (Heart and Smile) featured different artwork and different B-sides.

The B-sides to the Heart version were both covers of classic rock songs from the 1970s. "Landslide" was later included on the compilation album Pisces Iscariot, after which it received significant airplay on U.S. Modern Rock stations, peaking at number 3 on that chart. "Dancing in the Moonlight" performed well in Australia, where it charted at number 90 on the Triple J Hottest 100 in 1994, while "Disarm" did not chart.

The UK 7-inch purple vinyl single features an exclusive B-side "Siamese Dream". In 2005, the track was released as a download as part of the Rarities and B-sides compilation.

Music video 

The music video, directed by Jake Scott, is mainly in black and white and shows the members of the band floating over images of a house, an old man walking through an underpass while home movie-esque; color footage shows a young boy (Sean Adams, now known as Amber Adams) playing outside. Billy Corgan has said that he didn't want the old man in the video, but Scott insisted. The video premiered on MTV in early 1994 and was immediately placed into heavy rotation and spent a month as an MTV Exclusive video. Later that year it was nominated for Best Alternative Video and Best Editing in a Video (Editor: Pat Sheffield) at the MTV Video Music Awards, the Pumpkins' first MTV Video Music Awards nominations.

Track listing
All songs were written by Billy Corgan except where noted.

UK 7-inch vinyl single (7243 8 92309 7 0, HUT 43)
 "Disarm" – 3:17
 "Siamese Dream" – 2:38

UK CD single 1 ("Smile" cover)
 "Disarm" – 3:17
 "Soothe" (Demo) – 2:35
 "Blew Away" (James Iha) – 3:31

UK CD single 2 ("Heart" cover)
 "Disarm" – 3:17
 "Landslide" (Stevie Nicks) – 3:10
 "Dancing in the Moonlight" (Phil Lynott) – 4:21

Charts

Weekly charts

Year-end charts

References

External links
  
 Allmusic [ review]

1990s ballads
1993 songs
1994 singles
Black-and-white music videos
Music videos directed by Jake Scott (director)
Alternative rock ballads
The Smashing Pumpkins songs
Song recordings produced by Billy Corgan
Song recordings produced by Butch Vig
Songs banned by the BBC
Songs written by Billy Corgan
Virgin Records singles